Susarla Dakshinamurthi Jr. (Telugu: సుసర్ల దక్షిణామూర్తి; 1921 – 2012) was an Indian music composer, playback singer, record producer, Carnatic musician, multi-instrumentalist, and an eminent violinist known for his works in the South Indian film industry, Hindi cinema, Sri Lankan cinema, and Hollywood.

Dakshinamurthi is the grandson of Susarla Dakshinamurthi Sr. who belongs to the student clan of saint Tyagaraja. He is known for his compositions in works such as Narada Naradi (1946) (music director), Laila Majnu (1949) (playback singer), Paramanandayya Sishyula Katha (1950) (playback singer and music director), Samsaram (1950) (music director), Sri Lakshmamma Katha (1950) (playback singer and music director), Sarvadhikari (1951) (playback singer and music director), Yaar Paiyyan (1957) (music director), Santhanam (1955) (playback singer and music director), Jungle Moon Men (1955), (re-recordist and conductor), Ilavelpu (1956) (playback singer and music director), Veera Kankanam (1957) (music director), Annapurna (1959) (music director), Krishna Leelalu (1959) (music director), Narthanasala (1963), which won the National Film Award for Second Best Feature Film, Sri Madvirata Parvam  (1979), Srimadvirat Veerabrahmendra Swami Charitra (1984).

Biography

Early life
He was born on 11 November 1921 in Pedakallepalli, Krishna District of present-day Andhra Pradesh, India to Krishnabrahma Sastry, who was a musician and teacher and Smt. Annapurnamma. He graduated with an arts degree in classical music, and became a proportional violinist at the age of nine. He subsequently worked as Harmonium player for the label His Master's Voice in 1938. He then worked for All India Radio as A-grade artist in the late 1930s, and became the Director for South Indian region.

Film career
He then moved to cinema and conducted music alongside C. R. Subburaman. He made Lata Mangeshkar sing the ever popular song Nidurapora Thammuda, in his movie Santhanam (1955). Samsaram (1950) movie was a musical hit film with ever popular song Samsaram Samsaram by Ghantasala and A. M. Rajah in Telugu and Tamil languages respectively. He then ventured into Hollywood, and became a re-recordist, and conductor for works such as Jungle Moon Men (1955), and several others by Columbia pictures.

Dakshinamurthy has produced hits tracks such as Challani Raja O Chandamama written by Raghunath Panigrahi. He sang Challani Punnami Vennelalone casting Relangi in the film. His music for Nartanasala (1963) particularly the songs Evari Kosam Ee Mandhahasam, Naravara Kuruvara (S. Janaki), Janani Siva Kaamini (P. Susheela), Salalitha Raga Sudharasa Saaram (M. Balamuralikrishna) and Sakhiya Vivarinchave are forever memorable. Later he worked on musical hits such as Sri Madvirata Parvam (1979) and Srimadvirat Veerabrahmendra Swami Charitra (1984). He then ventured into film production and produced Mohini Rukmangada (1960) and Rama Sundari (1962) under Anuradha Movies.

Later life and death
Murthi developed Diabetic retinopathy and lost vision in one eye in 1972 and the other in 1987. Murthi died at his residence in Chennai on 9 Feb 2012. He expressed difficulty in breathing when an ambulance was called in. That was only 5 minutes before his death when he said that he did not want to be taken to the hospital. Just as he had wanted he died at 9.30 PM when the ambulance reached at 9.35 PM.

Selected filmography

Music director

Playback singer

References

External links
 

Telugu film score composers
Telugu playback singers
1921 births
2012 deaths
Tamil musicians
Tamil singers
20th-century Indian composers
20th-century Indian singers
People from Krishna district
Indian male playback singers
Film directors from Andhra Pradesh
Tamil Nadu State Film Awards winners
Columbia Records artists
Tamil playback singers
Bollywood playback singers
Singers from Chennai
Film musicians from Andhra Pradesh
Tamil film score composers
Singers from Andhra Pradesh
Indian male film score composers
20th-century Indian male singers